Can't See for Lookin is an album by jazz pianist Red Garland, recorded in 1958 but not released until 1963 on Prestige Records.

Track listing 
"I Can't See for Lookin (Nadine Robinson, Dock Stanford) – 9:28
"Soon" (George & Ira Gershwin) – 6:56
"Blackout" (Avery Parrish, Sammy Lowe) – 8:56
"Castle Rock" (Ervin Drake, Jimmy Shirl, Al Sears) – 9:45

Personnel 
 Red Garland – piano
 Paul Chambers – double bass
 Art Taylor – drums

References 

1963 albums
Albums produced by Bob Weinstock
Prestige Records albums
Red Garland albums
Albums recorded at Van Gelder Studio